Paul In 't Ven (born 1 April 1945) is a Belgian former racing cyclist. He rode in the 1967 and 1969 Tour de France as well as the 1970 Giro d'Italia. His brother Willy and nephew Danny were also professional cyclists. In 1967, he also won the Scheldeprijs, Grand Prix d'Isbergues and the Heistse Pijl.

Major results
1966
 1st Stages 2 & 4 Tour de Namur
1967
 1st Scheldeprijs
 1st Heistse Pijl
 1st Grand Prix d'Isbergues
 1st Stage 2 (TTT) Tour of Belgium
 2nd Grote Prijs Marcel Kint
 3rd Omloop Mandel-Leie-Schelde

References

External links
 

1945 births
Living people
Belgian male cyclists
Sportspeople from Turnhout
Cyclists from Antwerp Province
20th-century Belgian people